Santa Maria Coghinas (Gallurese: Cuzina) is a comune (municipality) in the Province of Sassari in the Italian region Sardinia, located about  north of Cagliari and about  northeast of Sassari, in the Anglona traditional region, on the banks of Coghinas river.

Santa Maria Coghinas borders the following municipalities: Bortigiadas, Bulzi, Perfugas, Sedini, Valledoria, Viddalba. It is known since the early 11th century as part of the giudicato of Torres. It is an autonomous commune since 1983.

Sights include the Doria castle and the Romanesque-Gothic church of Madonna delle Grazie.

References

Cities and towns in Sardinia
1983 establishments in Italy
States and territories established in 1983